Sir Thomas Estcourt (c. 1570 – 4 July 1624) was an English lawyer and politician who sat in the House of Commons in 1624.

Estcourt was the son of Thomas Estcourt of Gray's Inn and his wife Hannah Ascough. He matriculated at Magdalen College, Oxford, on 29 April 1586, aged 16 and was called to the bar at Gray's Inn in 1593. He became an Ancient of Gray's Inn on 11 February 1604. In 1607, he was High Sheriff of Gloucestershire and was knighted on 6 November 1607. 

In 1597, he was elected Member of Parliament for Malmesbury. In 1624 he was re-elected for Gloucestershire but died later in the year. 

Estcourt married Mary Savage, daughter of William Savage of Elmley Castle, Worcestershire.

References

1570s births
1624 deaths

Members of Gray's Inn
Alumni of Magdalen College, Oxford
High Sheriffs of Gloucestershire
Politicians from Gloucestershire
English MPs 1597–1598
English MPs 1624–1625
Knights Bachelor